This article is about the American Billboard Hot 100 chart held during the 1980s.

The Billboard Hot 100 chart is the main song chart of the American music industry and is updated every week by the Billboard magazine. During the 1980s the chart was based collectively on each single's weekly physical sales figures and airplay on American radio stations.

George Michael was the only artist to achieve two year-end Billboard Hot 100 number-one singles in the 1980s. He achieved this with his songs "Faith" and "Careless Whisper". He is one of two recording acts to achieve more than one year-end Billboard Hot 100 number-one single in the history of the chart, with the other being The Beatles, who also had two year-end number-ones.

Number ones 
Key
 – Number-one single of the year

Notes
"That's What Friends Are For" was performed by singers Dionne Warwick, Elton John, Gladys Knight and Stevie Wonder, all of whom are also credited individually for the song on the Billboard charts.

Statistics by decade

Artist by total number-one singles 
The following artists achieved four or more number-one hits during the 1980s.

Note: For singer George Michael, if Wham! is included, this would give George Michael eight number-one songs.
Note: For singer Phil Collins, if Genesis is included, this would give Phil Collins eight number-one songs.

Artists by total number of weeks at number one 
The following artists were featured in top of the chart for the highest total number of weeks during the 1980s.

George Michael's duet with Aretha Franklin as well as the song "Careless Whisper", where he is credited as a featured artist (internationally, he is credited solo on this record), are counted towards his total number of weeks. His other two number ones with Wham!—"Wake Me Up Before You Go-Go" and "Everything She Wants"—are not counted.
When adding the weeks for all of Phil Collins' number-one singles during the 1980s, it comes out to 15. (This does not include the Genesis song "Invisible Touch".) However, "Another Day in Paradise" spent its final two weeks at number one in 1990—January 6 and 13—so those two weeks do not count toward his tally in the 1980s.

Songs by total number of weeks at number one 
The following songs were featured in top of the chart for the highest total number of weeks during the 1980s.

See also
 List of UK Singles Chart number ones of the 1980s
 List of number-one hits (United States)
 1980s in music

References

United States Hot 100
 1980s